Beacon Council may refer to:

Beacon Council (award), a British local authority designation
Beacon Council, BSA, a defunct Boy Scouts of America council

See also
Beacon (disambiguation)